The San Marino Futsal Championship is the premier  futsal championship in San Marino.  It was founded in 2006.  The San Marino championship currently consists of 12 teams. Organized by Federazione Sammarinese Giuoco Calcio.

Champions

External links
futsalplanet.com
smtvsanmarino.sm

Futsal competitions in San Marino
futsal
San Marino
Sports leagues established in 2006
2006 establishments in San Marino